Collix blosyra is a moth in the  family Geometridae. It is found on Borneo. The habitat consists of upper montane forests.

References

Moths described in 1926
blosyra